Vinicius Bueno Bovi (born December 18, 1981 in Limeira), known as Vinicius Bovi, is a Brazilian footballer who plays as right back.

Career statistics

References

External links

1981 births
Living people
Brazilian footballers
Association football defenders
Avaí FC players